Ali Shams al-Din was the 18th Tayyibi Isma'ili Dāʿī al-Muṭlaq in Yemen. He succeeded his brother al-Hasan Badr al-Din I in 1418, and held the post until his death in 1428, when he was succeeded by his nephew (al-Hasan's son) Idris Imad al-Din.

Life
After the death of Hasan,  Ali took up residence in the fortress of Dhu Marmar. But in 1426, the Zaydi imam of Sana'a, al-Mansur Ali, captured Dhu Marmar after a siege, but allowed the Dāʿī with his family, followers, and possessions to leave the town and move to Haraz, which became the new base of the Tayyibi movement. The Tayyibis also lost a number of other fortresses to the Zaydis at this time, which were later recovered by Idris Imad al-Din. Ali then moved to Af'eda and then to Shibaam. 

It was during his tenure that there was a major split into Sunni Bohra led by Jafar bin Khwaja, a native of Patan, Gujarat in Gujarat, India. This split caused deep anxiety and mental agony to Ali. His brother, Maad Izzuddin took him to Shareqa.

Mausoleum
Syedna Ali died in Shareqa, Yemen. Syedna Mohammed Burhanuddin built and completed a mausoleum of Syedna Ali in 2007.

Gallery

References

Sources
 
 

Year of birth unknown
1428 deaths
Banu al-Walid al-Anf
Tayyibi da'is
15th century in Yemen
Burials in Yemen
15th-century monarchs in the Middle East
15th-century Arabs
15th-century Ismailis
15th-century Islamic religious leaders